Martin K. Bracey (born September 17, 1954, in Chicago, Illinois), known as Marty Bracey, is an American drummer and percussionist mostly known for being in many Japanese bands. He has worked with Minako Honda, Junko Yagami, and Kenji Ozawa as well as bands such as Omega Tribe and Monta & Brothers.

Biography 
Bracey started playing drums at the age of 12. At the age of 18, Bracey made his professional debut in America performing for Jackie Wilson, The Chi-Lites, and Tyrone Davis during live performances.

He came to Japan in 1973, making his professional debut in Japan in 1978. He started in Japan as the drummer for Rie Nakahara's song "Tokyo Lullaby," which peaked at No. 9 on the charts, as well as being the drummer for Izumi Kobayashi & Flying Mimi Band. Two years later, he joined the Japanese band Monta & Brothers, drumming for the single "Dancing All Night" which was a No. 1 single on the Oricon charts for 10 consecutive weeks. In 1984, he formed Marty & Mystics with keyboardist Keisaku Takahashi and bassist Masahiko Takeuchi, releasing only one album. In 1987, he was hired as a drummer for the Japanese band 1986 Omega Tribe, helping with the band during their rename to Carlos Toshiki & Omega Tribe and their debut album. He was also present during their final concerts in 1991. During this time, Bracey formed the band Silk with Wornell Jones and Tetsuya Osaka, both members of Omega Tribe's backing band, and released one album and single in 1988.

In 2003, he released the album Soul Shogun. In 2015, he formed the band B-EDGE along with Jones and Teruo Gotō, all were members of Omega Tribe's backing band. Japanese Brazilian singer Carlos Toshiki, the lead singer of 1986 Omega Tribe and Carlos Toshiki & Omega Tribe, joined the band briefly in 2017.

Discography

As a solo artist

With Izumi Kobayashi & Flying Mimi Band

With Marty & Mystics

With Silk

References 

Omega Tribe (Japanese band) members
1954 births
Living people
American drummers